Dale Robin Deeb (born 8 September 1990) is a South African former cricketer. He is a left-handed batsman and a left-arm slow bowler who played for Gauteng.

Deeb began his first-class career in January 2008, playing four games in the SAA Provincial Three-Day Challenge. He took five wickets in his debut match.

Deeb was the second highest wicket-taker for South Africa Under-19s in their series win over England in January 2009. He played twelve Youth ODIs and one Youth T20 in total.

In 2012 he was appointed as Professional for Blackpool Cricket Club in the Northern Cricket League.

He had a successful season in South Africa in 2014-15 but, seeing little prospect of making a livelihood from the sport, he retired from cricket to work for a company that imports ceilings and partitions for offices and homes.

References

External links
Dale Deeb at Cricket Archive

1990 births
South African cricketers
Gauteng cricketers
Living people